The Vondish Ambassador (2007) is a fantasy novel by American writer Lawrence Watt-Evans set in his Ethshar universe. He serialized it with a variant of the Street Performer Protocol. 

2007 American novels
Novels first published in serial form
American fantasy novels